The Fighting Marines is a 1935 movie serial.  It was the last serial produced by Mascot Pictures before the studio was bought out and merged with others to become Republic Pictures.  This new company went on to become the most famous of the serial producing studios, starting with Darkest Africa in 1936.

Future Republic producer Franklin Adreon first became involved with serials with this production.  The former regular Marine, then a Marine Corps Reserve officer, was a technical consultant and played the small role of Captain Holmes in the later chapters.

Plot
When the United States Marine Corps starts building a landing strip on Halfway Island in the Pacific Ocean, they interfere with the secret hideout of the masked mystery villain, The Tiger Shark, who begins to sabotage their efforts.  Sergeant Schiller is abducted by the villain after developing a gyrocompass that could pinpoint his location.  Corporal Lawrence and Sergeant McGowan attempt to rescue him and stop the Tiger Shark for good.

Cast
Grant Withers as Corporal Larry Lawrence, US Marine
Adrian Morris as Sergeant Mack McGowan, US Marine
Ann Rutherford as Frances Schiller
Robert Warwick as Colonel W. R. Bennett, US Marine
George J. Lewis as Sergeant William Schiller, US Marine abducted by the Tiger Shark
Patrick H. O'Malley, Jr. as Captain Grayson
Victor Potel as Fake Native Chief, one of the Tiger Shark's henchmen
Jason Robards Sr. as Kota
Warner Richmond as Metcalf, one of the Tiger Shark's henchmen
Robert Frazer as H. R. Douglas
J. Frank Glendon as M. J. Buchanan
Donald Reed as Pedro, one of the Tiger Shark's henchmen
Max Wagner as Gibson, one of the Tiger Shark's henchmen
Richard Alexander as Ivan, one of the Tiger Shark's henchmen
Tom London as Miller, one of the Tiger Shark's henchmen

Production

Stunts
Yakima Canutt
George DeNormand doubling Grant Withers
Eddie Parker doubling Adrian Morris

Special effects
Photographic effects by Bud Thackery
Model effects by the Lydecker brothers

Soundtrack
 Semper Fidelis by John Philip Sousa

Chapter titles
 Human Targets
 Isle of Missing Men
 The Savage Horde
 The Mark of the Tiger Shark
 The Gauntlet of Grief
 Robber's Roost
 Jungle Terrors
 Siege of Halfway Island
 Death from the Sky
 Wheels of Destruction
 Behind the Mask
 Two Against the Horde
Source:

See also
 List of film serials
 List of film serials by studio

References

External links

 The Fighting Marines at Internet Archive

1935 films
American black-and-white films
1930s English-language films
Mascot Pictures film serials
Films directed by B. Reeves Eason
Films directed by Joseph Kane
Films about the United States Marine Corps
1935 adventure films
Articles containing video clips
Films produced by Nat Levine
American adventure films
1930s American films